Harry Nkopeka (born 12 October 1948) is a Malawian middle-distance runner. He competed in the men's 800 metres at the 1972 Summer Olympics.

References

1948 births
Living people
Athletes (track and field) at the 1972 Summer Olympics
Malawian male middle-distance runners
Olympic athletes of Malawi
Place of birth missing (living people)